Ganja rugs or Geunge rugs are a category of Caucasian rug from the town of Gəncə, Azerbaijan, also written Geunge, Gendje or Ganja. Gəncə is located between the weavings areas of Karabagh, Kazakh and Shirvan and it also acted as a marketing centre for weaving from those surrounding areas.

Ganja carpet-making school includes Ganja city and its surrounding villages and territories of the Samukh, Gadabay, Shamkir regions. Ganja carpet making school had a positive influence on the carpet-making of the surrounding regions.  Ganja carpet-making school includes compositions like "Ganja carpet", "Old Ganja carpet", "Golkend carpet", "Fakhralı carpet", "Chaykend carpet", "Chaylı carpet", "Shadyly carpet", "Chyraqly carpet", "Samukh carpet". The namaz praying carpet "Fakhraly" included in Ganja group distinguishes with its high art feature, kind of knitting from other carpet compositions.

Carpets

Ganja 
Ganja carpets were produced not only in the city of Ganja, but also in Garabaghli, Borsunlu, Shadyli, Garadagli, Shamkir and other carpet-making points. The carpets woven in Ganja were called “Ganja-city". The market price of such carpets was higher than the cost of Ganjacarpets made in the villages.

Ganja carpets' composition, color selection, and style differ from other Azerbaijani rugs. The first type of Ganja carpets is characterized by designs composed of octagons, stars, or three geometric medallions arranged on the carpets` longitudinal axis. The carpets` color is usually blue, dark blue and madder red. The intermediate area of the second type of Ganja carpets is decorated with several lakes. These lakes are often found in cross and octagonal forms.

Ancient Ganja (Gadim Ganja) 
Ancient Ganja carpets or Gadim Ganja carpets also belong to the category of carpets made in Ganja carpet-weaving school. The carpets were named after Ancient Ganja where they were produced. At the same time, the art critics called these carpets "Ganja carpets", "Ganja-Paisley carpets" or "Ganja carpets with Paisley". Ancient Ganja carpets were produced in Ganja city, in the carpet-making point around Ganja, as well as in the Shamkir region which is located 40 km north-west of the city.

Typically, the composition of the middle field of the Ancient Ganja carpets is dominated by paisley patterns called Ganja -Buta. Ganja-Buta patterns, which are typical for Ganja carpet-making school, are sometimes laid on the diagonal. There are pile patterns on the left and right sides of the middle field of the carpets. The pattern is a religious symbol.

The composition of the middle field of the Ancient Ganja carpets with original features consisted of rectangular elements or different widths and narrow strips. The background of the Ancient Ganja carpets is plain weave.

Fakhrali 
Fakhrali carpets are also included in the category of Ganja carpets. The carpets were called after Fakhrali village which is located 25 km north-east of the city. Some carpet-makers call these carpets "The honor of Genje". Fakhrali carpets were mainly produced in the village of Fakhrali, as well as in the villages of Garajmirli, Shadyli, Bagchakurd, Chayli, Borsunlu, Garadagli, Panahlilar and other villages. In the nineteenth century, Fakhrali carpet was woven in the carpet-making station located in Georgia, and in the border villages of Azerbaijan.

Fakhrali carpets were mainly made in small size because they were used in religious ceremonies, as well as at the ceremony. Therefore Fakhrali carpets are also named as "Çaynamaz" or "Jenamaz" (carpet for namaz).The arc in upper part of the middle field of the carpet resembles Eastern architecture elements, especially the southern part of mosques for its appearance and shape. Fakhrali carpets can be divided into two types: complex patterned carpets, simple patterned carpets. Large lake pattern in rectangular form decorates the center of the middle field of simple patterned Fakhrali carpets. But the middle part of complex patterned Fakhrali carpets included square and octagonal lake patterns. Basic ornaments like bricks, large and small "gedebeyler", "earrings" and flags are used in weaving of complex patterned Fakhrali carpets.

Gedebey 
Gedebey carpets are produced in Gedebey district, 50 km west of Genje. The produce centers of Gedebey carpet-making school included the Chaykend and Golkand villages in the near past.

The middle field of the carpet is decorated with star-shaped medallions extending vertically. Long rectangles are placed among them. The whole central part of the carpet is in the form of a border pattern.

The "Garagoz" border pattern forms the foreground and the background, at the same time separates them from each other. The main characteristic elements of the decoration of Gedebey carpets are blue lake patterns located in the foreground and yellow-colored rectangular patterns located among these lake patterns. The Gadabay carpets are composed of simple patterned stripes belonging to Genje-Gazakh carpets.

Chayli 
Chayli carpets belong to the category of middle-quality carpets made in Genje carpet-making school. The carpets were named after Chayli village (20 km south-east of Genje city) where they were produced. Some carpet-makers call this carpet "Genje-city", "Gazakhcha", "Oysuzlu", "Garakhanli".

Chayli carpets were woven by adapting some elements of middle parts of Gobustan carpets and Maraza carpets which belong to the Shirvan carpet-making school to the technical specifications of "Ganja carpets".

The middle field of Chayli carpet is decorated a large lake pattern with a long hinged red background which is the basic element of these carpets and the free space of the black middle field is decorated with a bouquet pattern called "Bandi-rumi".

In the middle area of Çaylı carpets, a large lake with a long hinged red background, which is characteristic of these carpets, is placed in a middle ground and the free space of the middle field with black color is decorated with a wooden pattern known as "Bandi-rumi".

Chiragli 
Chiragli carpets belong to the category of middle-quality carpets made in Genje carpet-making school.

Chiragli carpets were primarily produced in the village of Chiragli in Dashkesen district, located 35 km south of Ganja. After a while, these carpets began to be produced in all carpet-making points in the Ganja . In some regions, these carpets were called "Kazakhcha carpet", "Ganja carpet", "Fakhrali carpet", "Shamkhor carpet", etc. because production of these carpets was widespread in these areas.

Samukh 
Samukh carpets are the oldest and most popular carpets among the Ganja carpets. The carpets were named after the Samukh settlement, 35 km north of Ganja where it was primarily produced. Samukh carpets are also produced in Kassan, Salahli, Poylu, Gazakhly and other carpet-making points locating in the north-western part of Samukh.

The simple, but original composition of the carpet differs from the composition of other Genje carpets. The center of the middle field is decorated with a square lake pattern including several long horizons in it. At the upper and lower parts of the lake pattern there are medium-sized star-shaped medallions. These medallions are more characteristic for Shirvan and Guba carpets, especially the Zeyve carpets.

Shadili 
Shadilibelong to the category of middle-quality carpets that made in Ganja carpet-making school. Shaded carpets were woven in the village of Shadili, located 25 km from Ganja, at the foot of the Minor Caucasus mountain range. As shadili tribe lived in the village was engaged in breeding, the carpet-making was developed in the village. In some regions, Shadili carpets are called "Gazakh carpets", "Ganja carpets", "Caucasus carpets" and "Agstafa carpets".

Gallery

References 

Ian Bennett, Oriental Rugs, Volume 1 Caucasian, Antique Collectors Club 1981, 

Azerbaijani rugs and carpets
Azerbaijani culture